Hot Country Songs and Country Airplay are charts that rank the top-performing country music songs in the United States, published by Billboard magazine. Hot Country Songs ranks songs based on digital downloads, streaming, and airplay not only from country stations but from stations of all formats, a methodology introduced in 2012. Country Airplay, which began publication in 2012, is based solely on country radio airplay, a methodology that had previously been used from 1990 to 2012 for Hot Country Songs.

The year began with "Big, Big Plans" by Chris Lane returning to number one on the Country Airplay chart, having previously topped the listing in the issue of Billboard dated December 19, 2020, while "I Hope" by Gabby Barrett held the top spot on Hot Country Songs, the song's 22nd week atop the chart.  Barrett thus continued to extend her record for the longest-running number one song on that chart by a solo female artist, having broken the record two weeks earlier.  The song was displaced from the top spot in the issue dated January 23 by Morgan Wallen's "Wasted on You", but returned to the peak position the following week. In February, Taylor Swift debuted atop Hot Country Songs with a re-recorded version of her 2008 number one single, "Love Story". It was her first chart-topper on that listing since 2012's "We Are Never Ever Getting Back Together" and her first to enter at the top of the chart. Furthermore, it made Swift the second artist to top the chart twice with different recordings of the same song after Dolly Parton with "I Will Always Love You".

In March, Niko Moon gained his first number one as a performer when "Good Time" topped both charts; he had previously written a number of chart-toppers for the Zac Brown Band. It was the first debut single to simultaneously top both listings since 2014.   Walker Hayes achieved his first chart-topper in July when "Fancy Like" topped Hot Country Songs; the song had become a viral success based on a video on social media site TikTok, and by the end of the year had spent 20 weeks atop the listing.  In September, Lainey Wilson gained her first number one when "Things a Man Oughta Know" reached the peak position on Country Airplay, and the following month "My Boy" topped the same chart to give Elvie Shane, a contestant on the fifteenth season of American Idol his first chart-topper.  Canadian singer MacKenzie Porter gained her first number one in December as a featured artist on Dustin Lynch's "Thinking 'Bout You", which ended the year atop the chart. The longest-lasting Country Airplay number one was Luke Combs's "Forever After All", which spent six weeks at the top.  The song was his 11th consecutive number one on that chart from the start of his career, extending his own record. Combs spent a total of thirteen weeks at number one and had four chart-topping singles, both more than any other act during 2021. Luke Bryan, Thomas Rhett, Florida Georgia Line, and Jason Aldean were the only other acts to achieve more than one chart-topper during the year, with two each.

Chart history

See also
2021 in country music
List of artists who reached number one on the U.S. country chart
List of Billboard number-one country albums of 2021

References

2021
Number-one country singles
United States Country Singles